The Russian Mineralogical Society (RMS) is a public scientific organization uniting specialists and scientific groups working in the field of mineralogy and adjacent sciences. RMS was founded in 1817 Saint Petersburg, Russia, and is the world oldest mineralogical society among present. From 1869 until nowadays its residence is the Saint Petersburg Mining Institute.

RMS represents the Russian Federation with regard to the science of mineralogy in any international context. RMS is a member and one of the establishers (Madrid, 8 April 1958) of the International Mineralogical Association.

Publications

 Proceedings of the Russian Mineralogical Society, is the print journal of the society, and it has been published continuously since 1830. It publishes scientific articles on mineralogy, petrology, deposits study, crystallography and geochemistry, and also articles on science history, critical and discussional announcements are published in the journal. In the part «Chronicles» information about the results of work of congresses, conferences and symposiums in the field of these sciences is given, and in the part «Bibliography» new monographs, reference books and text-books on mineralogy and adjacent disciplines are discussed.

Special Interest Commissions and Working Groups (WG)

 History,
 Cosmic Mineralogy,
 Crystal Genesis,
 Mineralogy of Gemstone Deposits and Gemology,
 Museums,
 New Minerals and Mineral Names,
 Organic Mineralogy,
 High School Teaching in Mineralogy,
 Crystal Chemistry and X-ray Diffraction of Minerals,
 Ore Mineralogy,
 Mineral Processing,
 Physical Methods of Investigation of Minerals,
 Environmental Mineralogy and Geochemistry,
 Experimental Mineralogy, and
 WG on Modern Mineral-Bearing Processes.

Awards
 Diploma,
 Honorary Certificate,
 Honorary Testimonial,
 Status of an Honorary Member.

Membership
Membership in the society is open to any person interested in mineralogy and related sciences regardless of residence or citizenship.

Annual Meeting
The RMS organizes general meetings every 4 years and also annual scientific sessions.

References

External links
Russian Mineralogical Society Official Website
Proceedings of the Russian Mineralogical Society (Zapiski RMO) Official Website

Geophysics societies
Geology societies
Scientific societies based in Russia
Scientific organizations established in 1817
1817 establishments in the Russian Empire